Barseghyan is an Armenian surname. Notable people with the surname include:

 Anahit Barseghyan (born 1994), Armenian swimmer 
 Avet Barseghyan (born 1980), Armenian songwriter
 Hovhannes Barseghyan (born 1970), Armenian weightlifter
 Souren Barseghyan (born 1959), Armenian football manager
 Tigran Barseghyan (born 1993), Armenian footballer

See also
 Parseghian
 

Armenian-language surnames